Latrodectus curacaviensis is a species of black widow spider, that belongs to the genus Latrodectus. It is known as the South American black widow, Brazilian black widow or Araña del trigo.

Description 
Like many black widow species, females are larger than males, growing up to 11–17 mm, with their body and legs black and red. Males are much smaller, known by their long legs, and white or brown color. Latrodectus curacaviensis is mainly nocturnal. It is not aggressive to humans, but females will attack to defend their egg sacs. It feeds on small insects. They have a distinct hourglass mark with a black diamond shape and four red triangles in a square. Bites are rare but dangerous.

Distribution and habitat 
It has been reported in the Lesser Antilles and South America. It is usually found under logs, in sheds, stone fireplaces, near trash and debris.

Venom 
The venom contains excitatory neurotoxins (alpha-latrotoxins). Bites usually deliver only small amounts of venom, which may result in dangerous symptoms mostly in children, old people and people with cardiovascular and respiratory problems. Reported symptoms include intense local pain. Systemic symptoms include sweating, rapid breathing, increased heart rate, eyelids swelling, salivation, rigid and painful abdominal muscles, nausea, vomits and impaired sight. In a case that occurred in the state of Amazonas, Brazil, other symptoms were reported, such as muscle spasms, fever, chills and intense sweating – common symptoms of latrodectism, There are some reports of priapism. The average venom yield is 0.60 mg, and the maximum is 1.30 mg, the lethal dose is 0.170 mg by intravenous injection and 0.240 mg by subcutaneous injection.

References

curacaviensis
Spiders of South America
Spiders described in 1776
Taxa named by Otto Friedrich Müller